Frank Smith, Jr. (born September 17, 1942), is a civil rights activist and politician in Washington, D.C.

Early years
Born in Newnan, Georgia, in 1942, Smith attended Morehouse College where he developed his appetite for activism.

Work with Student Nonviolent Coordinating Committee
Frank Smith Jr. had left school to organize what is called SNCC (Student Nonviolence Coordinating Committee), where they helped bring to people's attention that segregation was wrong and that nonviolence was the way to solve this problem. Frank had initially planned only to leave school until the next quarter started, but he had ended up staying six years. When Emmett Till was murdered, there was a note attached saying that "This is what happens when you civil rights workers come and then leave." (Forner, Karlyn). The note had motivated Frank to stay for longer than he had intended, which caused him to drop out of school entirely. Frank didn't want to be the reason why more African American's were lynched, so he felt as though he had to stay because his peer's lives depended on it. Now that he had left school all those years back, he now has to remain working at 73 years old to pay off for all those missed years. (Bond, Michael)
In 1960, Smith participated in the Rich's Department Store boycotts in Atlanta; and almost at the same time he was working with other students to establish Student Nonviolent Coordinating Committee. As a founding member of Student Nonviolent Coordinating Committee, Smith is recognized by his Student Nonviolent Coordinating Committee peers as the first Student Nonviolent Coordinating Committee worker sent into Mississippi to register voters. While based in Holly Springs, Mississippi, Smith worked in some of the most brutal and racist counties in Mississippi. Smith was also one of the few Student Nonviolent Coordinating Committee workers employed in the original Head Start program. Working with the Child Development Group of Mississippi, Smith's Head Start program was based in Jacksonville, Mississippi, in the heart of the Mississippi Delta.

Smith worked with native Mississippi sharecroppers who had been evicted from their homes when they requested a pay raise in the men's salaries from a flat rate of $6.00 per day to $1.25 per hour. The sharecroppers, Frank and his first wife, Jean Smith, purchased land, lived in tents where they were regular and ongoing targets for the plantation owner and friends during the year when they built housing, and established one of the first (and only) black cooperative communities in Mississippi—Strike City.

As part of Freedom Summer, Smith and Frank Soracco, another Student Nonviolent Coordinating Committee worker, traveled the United States to raise funds for travel and expenses for the Mississippi Freedom Democratic Party and his friend and colleague, Fannie Lou Hamer to attend the 1964 Democratic National Convention. With the help of Vice President Hubert Humphrey and party leader Walter Mondale, Johnson engineered a compromise in which the Democratic National Committee offered the Mississippi Freedom Party two at-large seats, allowing them to watch the floor proceedings but not take part. The Mississippi Freedom Party refused this compromise, which permitted the undemocratic, white-only, regulars to keep their seats and denied votes to the Mississippi Freedom Party. While they were unsuccessful at being seated, their presence and Hamer's testimony led to the passage of the Voting Rights Act of 1965.
  
During the Civil Rights Movement, Frank had organized two writers to write what was called "The Student Voice" (Published in Atlanta), which Frank referred to as "The movement newspaper." The paper talked about the Atlanta movement and other little towns around the area. (Bond, Michael). The movement paper was critical to the SNCC community in spreading the word of freedom and justice for all.  

Frank also helped integrate schools and helped with transportation to and from school. He did this by helping tutor the children who were going to be integrating the schools when most other activists wouldn't because of the fear of what would happen to them if they helped. Frank also said, "I drove them to school in my Volkswagen bus." (ByAvis Thomas-Lester). Together they sang freedom songs and made the kids feel loved and safe on their journey to school and back.

Political career
After leaving Mississippi, Smith relocated to Washington, D.C., where he continued his service to community. Frank was elected to the D.C. Board of Education in 1979 and subsequently to the Council of the District of Columbia in 1982, where he served for 16 years.  His work focused on housing and economic development.  While on the Council, he served as chair of the Housing and Economic Development Committee, the Washington Metropolitan Area Transit Authority, and the Baseball Commission. As a council member, he shared his passion for gardening by introducing legislation to maintain the original victory gardens and to allow District residents to garden on vacant, District-owned properties.  Smith's urban housing activities included setting up the original Neimiah project in the District of Columbia and introducing legislation for urban homesteading.  He also served as chair of the District of Columbia Housing Authority.  Smith's office records from his time as a District council member are under the care of the Special Collections Research Center at the George Washington University.

Nonprofit organization leadership
After Smith's term on the Council, he focused on his passion, African American history, and found funding to build the African-American Civil War Memorial, establish a nonprofit organization that supports the African American Civil War Museum. Smith is the founding executive director and board member of the African American Civil War Memorial Freedom Foundation and Museum.

References

Bond, Michael, director. ASM_Interview 47_Frank Smith 4. YouTube, 1 Apr. 2016, https://youtube.com/uRXuxw6wssU. 
ByAvis Thomas-Lester / Urban News Service. “Frank Smith's Journey from Civil Rights Activist to Civil War Curator.” EBONY, 4 Aug. 2016, www.ebony.com/black-history/frank-smith-civil-war-museum/. 
Forner, Karlyn. “Frank Smith.” SNCC Digital Gateway, Mar. 2015, snccdigital.org/people/frank-smith/.

External links
 SNCC Digital Gateway: Frank Smith, Documentary website created by the SNCC Legacy Project and Duke University, telling the story of the Student Nonviolent Coordinating Committee & grassroots organizing from the inside-out
Preliminary Guide to the Frank Smith, Jr. Papers, 1987-1998, Special Collections Research Center. Estelle and Melvin Gelman Library. The George Washington University.
www.ebony.com/black-history/frank-smith-civil-war-museum/
https://youtube.com/uRXuxw6wssU. 

Members of the Council of the District of Columbia
Living people
1942 births
Student Nonviolent Coordinating Committee